Andrew 'Drew' Ketterer (born January 17, 1949) is an American lawyer and politician from Maine. Ketterer, a Democrat, serve two terms (1990-1994) in the Maine House of Representatives from Norridgewock, Maine. After not seeking a third term in 1994, Ketterer was elected by the Democratic majority of the Maine Legislature to be Maine Attorney General. He served three terms (1995-2001) as Attorney General. While in office, he made civil rights enforcement a priority of his office as well as fighting fraud and elder abuse. He was replaced by Speaker of the Maine House of Representatives G. Steven Rowe.

In July 2000, Ketterer was elected president of the National Association of Attorneys General. In that same month, the Portland Phoenix called Ketterer "the second most powerful man in Maine government next to the governor"

His wife, Susanne Ketterer, served a term (2002-2004) in the Maine House of Representatives as well.

References

1949 births
Living people
People from Norridgewock, Maine
Democratic Party members of the Maine House of Representatives
Maine Attorneys General